Pucker is a sour apple liqueur.

Pucker may also refer to:
 Peter Pucker (born 1988), Austrian soccer player
 Pucker! (Hairspray in the U.S.), a 1995 album by British band Selector
 Macular pucker or epiretinal membrane, an ocular disease
 Pucker (album), a 2013 album by jazz drummer Scott Amendola and guitarist Charlie Hunter

See also
 Pucker Up (disambiguation)